Elections to Moyle District Council were held on 30 May 1973 on the same day as the other Northern Irish local government elections. The election used three district electoral areas to elect a total of 16 councillors.

Election results

Districts summary

|- class="unsortable" align="centre"
!rowspan=2 align="left"|Ward
! % 
!Cllrs
! % 
!Cllrs
! %
!Cllrs
!rowspan=2|TotalCllrs
|- class="unsortable" align="center"
!colspan=2 bgcolor="" | UUP
!colspan=2 bgcolor="" | SDLP
!colspan=2 bgcolor="white"| Others
|-
|align="left"|Area A
|0.0
|0
|4.6
|0
|bgcolor="#DDDDDD"|95.4
|bgcolor="#DDDDDD"|4
|4
|-
|align="left"|Area B
|48.4
|4
|0.0
|0
|bgcolor="#0077FF"|51.6
|bgcolor="#0077FF"|4
|8
|-
|align="left"|Area C
|27.9
|1
|bgcolor="#99FF66"|43.1
|bgcolor="#99FF66"|2
|29.0
|1
|4
|-
|- class="unsortable" class="sortbottom" style="background:#C9C9C9"
|align="left"| Total
|21.9
|5
|12.0
|2
|66.1
|9
|16
|-
|}

Districts results

Area A

1973: 4 x Independent

Data missing from McCambridge's vote in stage 8, because the count was not continued after McAlister was elected over the quota for the final seat.

Area B

1973: 4 x UUP, 2 x Independent Unionist, 2 x Independent

Area C

1973: 2 x SDLP, 1 x UUP, 1 x Independent

References

Moyle District Council elections
Moyle